Lucerne Valley is a census-designated place (CDP) and valley landform in the southern Mojave Desert, in western San Bernardino County, California.

Geography

The geographic valley is defined by the surrounding Granite Mountains, Ord Mountains, and San Bernardino Mountains.

Lucerne Valley lies east of the Victor Valley, whose population nexus includes Victorville, Apple Valley, Adelanto and Hesperia.

The transportation nexus of Lucerne Valley is where State Route 247 and State Route 18 are connected by Old Woman Springs and Barstow Roads. The two highways do not have a direct junction.

In San Bernardino County, Lucerne Valley's area is also identified as County Service Area (CSA) 29.  While Lucerne Valley's "town limit" signs are within two miles of each other, the County Service Area Limits are much larger: in the west to Joshua Road (unpaved road east of Milpas Rd. on Hwy. 18), to the north at the  height of Ord Mountain on Highway 247, to the south at the entrance to Cushenbury Canyon on Highway 18, and at Old Woman Springs Ranch as the eastern boundary.  On June 11, 2013, Lucerne Valley and Johnson Valley were merged under the same Municipal Advisory Council, which serves as an advisory reporting agency to the County of San Bernardino District Supervisor concerning the region.  On August 14, 2013, Johnson Valley was sworn into the same Municipal Advisory Council as Lucerne Valley.  CSA 29's borders, however, remain unchanged from the move.

According to the United States Census Bureau, the CDP covers an area of 105.6 square miles (273.5 km), all of it land.

Climate
According to the Köppen Climate Classification system, Lucerne Valley has a semi-arid climate, abbreviated "BSk" on climate maps.

Demographics
The 2010 United States Census reported that Lucerne Valley had a population of 5,811. The population density was 55 persons per square mile (21.2/km). The racial makeup of Lucerne Valley was 4,507 (77.6%) White (66.8% Non-Hispanic White), 170 (2.9%) African American, 106 (1.8%) Native American, 90 (1.5%) Asian, 0 (0.0%) Pacific Islander, 676 (11.6%) from other races, and 262 (4.5%) from two or more races. Hispanic or Latino of any race were 1,447 persons (24.9%).

The census reported that 5,780 people (99.5% of the population) lived in households, 31 (0.5%) lived in non-institutionalized group quarters, and zero (0%) were institutionalized.

There were 2,176 households, out of which 685 (31.5%) had children under the age of 18 living in them, 954 (43.8%) were opposite-sex married couples living together, 280 (12.9%) had a female householder with no husband present, 157 (7.2%) had a male householder with no wife present.  There were 146 (6.7%) unmarried opposite-sex partnerships, and 14 (0.6%) same-sex married couples or partnerships. Sole individuals occupied 632 households (29.0%) and 255 (11.7%) had someone living alone who was 65 years of age or older. The average household size was 2.66. There were 1,391 families (63.9% of all households); the average family size was 3.28.

The population was spread out, with 1,424 people (24.5%) under the age of 18, 452 people (7.8%) aged 18 to 24, 1,214 people (20.9%) aged 25 to 44, 1,780 people (30.6%) aged 45 to 64, and 941 people (16.2%) who were 65 years of age or older.  The median age was 42.7 years. For every 100 females, there were 106.1 males. For every 100 females age 18 and over, there were 105.4 males.

The homeowner vacancy rate was 4.3%; the rental vacancy rate was 9.0%. Three thousand eight hundred people (65.4% of the population) lived in owner-occupied housing units and 1,980 people (34.1%) lived in rental housing units.

According to the 2010 United States Census, Lucerne Valley had a median household income of $30,142, with 18.4% of the population living below the federal poverty line.

Development

Zoning 
The majority of Lucerne Valley's zoning consists of Rural Residential, Resource Conservation and Residential zones.

Industrial zoning is predominantly in the southern border of the community on the north-facing slopes of the San Bernardino Mountains.

The commercial zoning corridor is primarily on State Route 18, with outlying businesses within a mile of the eastern half of the Old Woman Springs/Barstow Road junction. Commercial development is focused on mixed-use development, with storefronts facing the highway and a private residence on the same property behind the business on the same lot.  Traditional retail construction has been restrained in the latter half of the 20th century to keep the rural character of the town intact, but in September 2015 a Dollar General store opened as the first franchise grocery retail to enter town limits.

All residential zones are classified as Rural, Single or Medium density. Most housing developments are tract-based and were completed prior to the 1990s. No further tract-based construction projects have been built in 20 years, with most new construction done individually on privately owned lots. An attempt to construct a golf course and install utilities for residential/commercial zones called "Rancho Lucerne" began grading north of the high school site before embezzlement charges filed against the financier caused the project to shut down in 2001, leaving the site abandoned and desert habitat destroyed.

Utilities 
The majority of projects planned for the town are to transfer local resources for statewide use. Projects include solar power plants (all state power plants are required to sell generated energy to CalISO as a common carrier arrangement) as well as water for both direct use by the Los Angeles Department of Water and Power (LADWP) and wells used for cooling solar plants.  In 2012, LADWP cancelled an attempt to install a two mile wide water and power corridor in the southern half of the town.

Electricity service for the entire town is provided by Southern California Edison. Gas pipeline, water districts and trash service vary from neighborhood to neighborhood. A county landfill  is present in the northeast on Camp Rock Rd.

Education 
Lucerne Valley Unified School District operates three school campuses run by Lucerne Valley Unified School District.  Lucerne Valley Elementary School, built in 1952, serves grades K–5. Lucerne Valley Middle School was built in 1986 and formerly served grades 6–8. Lucerne Valley High School was built in 1992 and serve grades 6–12 after merging the portables from the prior middle school site onto the campus in 1998. The high school's first graduating class was in 1995. The school district office, community day school, and Mountain View High School have moved into the former Lucerne Valley Middle School site in the 2000s.

The Lucerne Valley Unified School District has had difficulty in recent years with financial issues, and lower than average test scores compared to San Bernardino County schools,.  The school district reported a student population of fewer than 800 pupils as of September 2015.

Public safety and amenities
San Bernardino County requires cities and towns to be incorporated. As Lucerne Valley is an unincorporated community in the county, services and local government responsibilities in Lucerne Valley are operated by the state and county.  San Bernardino County operates a sheriff's substation and a full-time staffed county fire station in town limits for fire and ambulance service. The same fire station serves as the CSA 29 field office, which operates a parks and recreation department to maintain the town parks, county facilities including a community center, senior center, the county library, an ATSC TV translator tower, and a public cemetery. Cal Fire also has a separate fire station east of the town between Lucerne Valley and Johnson Valley.

California Highway Patrol provides traffic enforcement and investigation from the Victorville office. Local emergencies are dispatched from the Adelanto Sheriff Office.

Economy
Mitsubishi Cement operates the Cushenbury plant in Lucerne Valley.

In popular culture
The dry lakes and mountainous terrain surrounding the town have been used in television, film, and photography, including movies such as Stagecoach (1939) and The Hills Have Eyes (1977).  On September 24–25, 2016, The Grand Tour on Amazon Prime shot an episode at Rabbit Dry Lake outside Lucerne Valley town limits.

Features
 Lucerne Dry Lake and Rabbit Springs Dry Lake — two dry lakes in the Lucerne Valley. A variety of small meteorites have been found in these two dry lakes. The Critically endangered wildflower Parish's popcornflower (Plagiobothrys parishii) is native to the springs of Rabbit Springs Dry Lake.

 Blackhawk Landslide — a prehistoric landslide that is one of the largest known in North America is in the southeast corner of the Lucerne Valley.

 Chimney Rock — a registered California Historical Landmark, in the mountains north of the Rabbit Springs Dry Lake and of Highway 18 near the Rabbit Springs Road junction. It is the site of the last battle between immigrant settlers and a Native American tribe in the Mojave Desert. Conflicts between Native Americans and white settlers over the rich lands of the San Bernardino Mountains culminated in the battle at Chimney Rock on February 16, 1867. Although Native Americans defended themselves fiercely, they were forced to retreat into the desert. In the years following, traditional Native American mountain food gathering areas were lost to white encroachment. A historical marker is beside Highway 18, next to the welcome sign on the town's western border.

Parks
Parks in the Lucerne Valley include:
 Pioneer Park, next to the fire station, is the main park for San Bernardino County's CSA 29 and used for most public community events.  The Lucerne Valley Museum is in the park, and has self-guided tours.
 Midway Park, at Midway and Rabbit Springs Roads, is the location of the Midway Schoolhouse and Equestrian Arena.
 Visalia Park, which used to be the Lucerne Springs Pool Club.  After the club was abandoned in 2011, the pool has been filled in and turned into a town park.
 The Johnson Valley OHV Area is mostly in Johnson Valley, and bordered on the west by Lucerne Valley. Expansion plans in 2012 for the Marine Corps Air Ground Combat Center Twentynine Palms threatened at one point to end the King of the Hammers seasonal off-road vehicle race that brings annual business to Lucerne Valley.
 Mojave Trails National Monument is to the east and north of the Lucerne Valley.

See also
 
 Solar power plants in the Mojave Desert
 Victorville Precision Bombing range

References

External links
 Digital-desert.com: Lucerne Valley Points of Interest
 Lucerne Valley Community website — (maintained by sisp.net)
 Lucerne Valley Chamber of Commerce
 Lucerne Valley Unified School District — Grades Pre, K-12.

Valleys of the Mojave Desert
Census-designated places in San Bernardino County, California
Populated places in the Mojave Desert
Valleys of San Bernardino County, California
Census-designated places in California
Valleys of California